Battle Township may refer to the following places in the United States:
 Battle Township, Ida County, Iowa
 Battle Township, Beltrami County, Minnesota

Township name disambiguation pages